The decade of the 1180s in art involved some significant events.

Events
 1185: The Comnenian Age of Byzantine art comes to an end when the Komnenian dynasty lose power

Works
 1183: Unkei transcribed two copies of the Lotus Sutra (calligraphy)
 1189: Kōkei sculpts Four Heavenly Kings in Kōfuku-ji

Births
 1180: Giunta Pisano – Italian painter (died 1258)

Deaths
 1189: Lin Tinggui – Chinese painter of the Southern Song Dynasty (born 1127)
 1182: Zhao Boju - Chinese landscape and flower painter of the Southern Song Dynasty (died 1120)

Art
Decades of the 12th century in art